Uncut currency sheets are common numismatics collector's items. They are often sold as souvenirs by issuers. After cutting, usually the banknotes can be used as legal tender; however, the cost to purchase uncut currency sheets is typically higher than the aggregate face value of the cut notes.

United States dollar 
The Bureau of Engraving and Printing (BEP) has been selling uncut sheets of United States dollars since October 26, 1981. 
Uncut American paper money issued prior to that is a rarity.

As of December 2019, the U.S. Mint's online store offers uncut sheets of $1, $2, $10, $20, $50, and $100 notes.

Other currencies 
 Ukrainian hryvnia

References 

Banknotes
Currency production
Numismatics